Stephen Richard Doty (born April 16, 1953) is an American mathematician specializing in algebraic representation theory (especially modular representation theory). 
He earned a doctorate in mathematics from University of Notre Dame in 1982 under the supervision of Warren J. Wong with dissertation The Submodule Structure of Weyl Modules for Groups of Type An.  After post-doctoral positions at University of Washington and University of Notre Dame, he joined the faculty at Loyola University Chicago in 1987.

In 2007 Doty was named the Inaugural Yip Fellow of Magdalene College, Cambridge University. In 2009 he was a Mercator Professor in Germany.

Selected publications

References

External links

 Home page
 Mathematical Reviews author profile

1953 births
Living people
Writers from Salt Lake City
20th-century American mathematicians
21st-century American mathematicians
Algebraists
Mathematicians from Illinois
Notre Dame College of Arts and Letters alumni
Loyola University Chicago faculty
University of Notre Dame faculty
University of Washington faculty